The Sepik–Ramu languages are an obsolete language family of New Guinea linking the Sepik, Ramu, Nor–Pondo (Lower Sepik), Leonhard Schultze (Walio–Papi) and Yuat families, together with the Taiap language isolate, and proposed by Donald Laycock and John Z'graggen in 1975.

Sepik–Ramu would consist of a hundred languages of the Sepik and Ramu river basins of northern Papua New Guinea, but spoken by only 200,000 people in all. The languages tend to have simple phonologies, with few consonants or vowels and usually no tones.

The best known Sepik–Ramu language is Iatmül. The most populous are Iatmül's fellow Ndu languages Abelam and Boiken, with about 35,000 speakers apiece.

Malcolm Ross and William A. Foley separately re-evaluated the Sepik–Ramu hypothesis in 2005. They both found no evidence that it forms a valid family. However, all of the constituent branches, except for Yuat within Ramu, remain individually valid in his evaluation. Ross links Nor–Pondo to Ramu in a Ramu–Lower Sepik proposal, places Leonhard Schultze (tentatively broken up into Walio and Papi) within an extended Sepik family, and treats Yuat and Taiap as independent families.

Classification

Ethnologue
This list is a mirror of the classification in Ethnologue 15.

Sepik–Ramu phylum (based on Laycock 1973)
 Taiap isolate
 Leonhard Schultze stock
 Walio family (4 languages)
 Papi family (2 languages)
 Nor–Pondo stock (6 languages)
 Ramu subphylum (37 languages)
 Ramu superstock (29 languages)
 Grass stock (5 languages)
 Arafundi family (2 languages)
 Annaberg stock (3 languages)
 Ruboni stock (8 languages)
 Ottilien family
 Misegian family
 Goam stock (11 languages)
 Ataitan family
 Tamolan family
 Yuat–Langam superstock (13 languages)
 Mongol–Langam family
 Yuat–Maramba stock
 Maramba isolate (unattested)
 Yuat family
 Sepik subphylum (50 languages) [see subclassification at that article]

Foley (2018)
Uncontroversially coherent subgroups accepted by Foley (2018) are:

Sepik (11 groups)
Ndu (Middle Sepik?)
Nukuma (Middle Sepik?)
Yerakai (Middle Sepik?)
Yellow River (Middle Sepik?)
Tama
Sepik Hill
Ram
Wogamus (Upper Sepik?)
Iwam (Upper Sepik?)
Abau (Upper Sepik?)
Amal

Ramu (5 groups)
Middle Ramu
Tamolan
Ataitan (Tanggu)
Ottilien–Misegian
Grass

Lower Sepik

Leonhard Schultze (Walio-Papi)
Walio
Papi

Yuat

Taiap

Lexical comparison
Below is a comparison of proto-Ndu, proto-Lower Sepik, and proto-Ottilien reconstructed by and listed in Foley (2005).

{| 
! gloss !! proto-Ndu !! proto-Lower Sepik !! proto-Ottilien
|-
| man, person || *ntɨw || *nor || *namot
|-
| water || *ŋkɨw || *arɨm || 
|-
| fire || *ya || *awr || *s(u)ək
|-
| sun || *ɲa ||  || *ra(u)
|-
| moon || *mpapmɨw || *m(w)il ? || *kər(v)i
|-
| breast || *mɨwɲ || *nɨŋgay || *mɨr
|-
| tooth || *nɨmpɨy || *sisiŋk ? || *nda(r)
|-
| bone || *apə || *sariŋamp || *ɣar
|-
| tongue || *tɨkŋa || *minɨŋ || *mi(m)
|-
| eye || *mɨyR || *tambri || *rəmeak
|-
| nose || *tam(w)ə ||  || *ŋgum
|-
| leg || *man || *namuŋk || *or ?
|-
| ear || *wan || *kwand- || 
|-
| name || *cɨ ||  || *ɣi
|-
| pig || *mp(w)al || *numpran || *rəkəm
|-
| snake || *kampwəy || *wakɨn || *ndop
|-
| mosquito || *kɨvɨy || *naŋgun || *ŋgit
|-
| eat || *kɨ || *am(b) || *amb
|-
| go || *yɨ || *wa || *saŋg
|-
| come || *ya || *ya || *kɨp
|-
| sit || *rə || *sa || *mbirak
|-
| stand || *rap(m) ||  || *-tik
|-
| one || *nək || *mb(w)ia- || *kaku
|-
| two ||  || *ri-pa- || *mbuniŋ
|-
| three ||  || *-ram || 
|}

Due to its highly divergent lexicon, Foley does not classify Sepik with Lower Sepik and Ramu.

The lexical data below is from the Trans-New Guinea database, Foley (2005), and Usher (2020) (for Proto-Arafundi).

See also
Papuan languages
Northwest Papuan languages

References

 
Proposed language families
Papuan languages
Languages of Papua New Guinea